Mynydd Illtud is an extensive area of common land near Libanus, Powys, Wales, located in the Brecon Beacons National Park and some three miles south-west of Brecon. Twyn y Gaer is the site of an Iron Age hill fort.

Geology

Like Cefn Llechid and Fforest Fach to the west, Mynydd Illtud is formed from the mudstones and sandstones of the St. Maughans Formation of the Old Red Sandstone laid down during the Devonian period. The sandstones have been quarried in places such as at Allt Lom.The area was overrun by ice during the last ice age and evidence of this is seen in the glacial till which is spread across this undulating plateau and the occasional erratic block of sandstone. Traeth Mawr and Traeth Bach, two rock hollows towards the south-western end of the common are now filled with peat, core sections of which have proved valuable in unravelling the climatic and vegetational history of this area over the last 10,000 years.

Access
Walkers can freely access the entire common as it is open access land, though horseriders and mountain-bikers are restricted to the minor roads, restricted byways and bridleways which criss-cross this area.  Other than along the public road network there is no legal right for the public to take motor vehicles (including motorbikes) across the common.  Landowners and those with commoners' rights do have certain vehicular rights over Mynydd Illtud. The Brecon Beacons Mountain Centre stands next to Mynydd Illtud on its eastern side and provides advice for visitors wishing to enjoy the area.

Archaeology

The Iron Age hillfort of Twyn y Gaer sits atop the grassy mound on the northern tip of the common. In the centre of the hill fort is a trig point. Though little remains of the ancient structure, the location affords good views towards the peaks of Pen-y-Fan and Corn Du as well as to the northern slopes of the Black Mountains and the river Usk. These excellent views of the surrounding area may explain why its naturally defensive spot was chosen for a settlement. Research by A. H. A. Hogg on this hill fort was published in 1982.

The course of a Roman road, Sarn Helen can be traced from south-west to north-east across the common.

Near Twyn y Gaer are a few pillow mounds which date from the 18th and 19th centuries, when rabbits were bred on a large scale for their meat and fur.

Llanilltyd church and associated earthworks are also of interest, as is Bedd Gwyl Illtyd.

See also
List of hill forts in Wales

References

External links
 images of Mynydd Illtud and surrounding area on geograph website

Mountains and hills of Powys
Fforest Fawr
Hillforts in Powys
Hillforts in the Brecon Beacons National Park
Mountains and hills of the Brecon Beacons National Park